Aleksei Nikolayevich Bach (17 March 1857 Zolotonosha, Poltava Governorate, Russian Empire, now Ukraine - 13 May 1946 Moscow) was a Soviet biochemist and revolutionary. He was a member of the Academy of Sciences of the Soviet Union and senior member of the Supreme Soviet.

Early life and education 
Bach grew up in Boryspil to a wine distillery technician's family. In 1875 he graduated from a high school in Kiev. After that he joined the Physico-Mathematical Department of at the University of Kyiv. After various revolutionary efforts, he emigrated to France in 1885 and later to Switzerland.

However, in 1878 he was expelled for taking part in student disturbances and joined the Narodnaya Volya (People's Freedom) revolutionary party which was active against the tsarist regime, was arrested and exiled to Belozersk, from where he returned to Kiev in December 1881 to continue his revolutionary activity. As from 1883 Bach went underground to live in Kharkov, Yaroslavl, Kazan and Rostov. During that period, he wrote his celebrated revolutionary book Tsar Hunger, which played an important role in spreading the ideas of scientific socialism in Russia.

Research 
In 1885, after Narodnaya Volya was crushed, Bach emigrated to Paris to engage in scientific and literary work in the Montieur Scientifique journal. In 1890, he started experimental studies in the laboratory of Professor Paul Schützenberger, a well-known chemist at the Collège de France in Paris, which he followed in 1891 to a research trip in the United States. In 1894, Bach moved to Geneva, where he worked in his private chemical laboratory and did joint research with Professor R. Chodat of Geneva University, a well-known Swiss scientist. It was precisely during the Geneva period of his life that Bach developed his peroxide theory of respiratory processes and took active part in Swiss scientific activities.

Swiss scientists showed respect for Bach: the Geneva Society of Physical and Natural Sciences elected him its chairman for the year 1916.

built up an international reputation in medical and agricultural chemistry for his research on catalysis and photosynthesis. Bach's scientific focus was the study of the assimilation of carbon dioxide as well as the mechanism of oxidation to peroxides. Engler-Bach peroxide theory was named after him.

Bach's initial works in the 1890s were devoted to the chemical mechanism of assimilation of carbon dioxide by green plants. At that time, Baeyer's concept was already prevalent in science. Proceeding from Butlerov's discovery that sugars form from formaldehyde under the effect of alkalis, Baeyer suggested that formaldehyde, which in condensing yields sugar, was the primary product of photosynthesis. In his works devoted to the biochemistry of photosynthesis, Bach, while agreeing with Baeyer in regard to the role of formaldehyde in the forming of sugar, gave a somewhat different interpretation of the mechanism itself.

Political views 
He was appointed its first director and the institute, where outstanding Soviet biochemists W.A. Engelgardt, A. E. Braunstein, B.I. Zbarsky, D.M. Mikhlin, A. I. Oparin, and others initially worked, played a major role in the development of biochemistry in the USSR. In 1929, Bach was elected full member of the USSR Academy of Sciences. In 1935, together with Oparin, he organized in Moscow the Institute of Biochemistry, USSR Academy of Sciences, of which he was director to the last days of his life; the institute is now named after Bach. Also in 1935, Bach founded the Soviet scientific journal Biochemistry and was elected President of the D.I. Mendeleev All-Union Chemical Society. In 1939, he was elected Academician-Secretary, Division of Chemical Sciences, USSR Academy of Sciences. In addition to being active in research and scientific organization, Bach was very active in public affairs: he was a member of the USSR Central Executive Committee and Deputy of the USSR Supreme Soviet.

A Bolshevik sympathizer, he moved back to Russia, 1917, and founded the Central Chemical Laboratory (the Karpov Physical Chemistry Institute from 1922), and remained there until his death. He undertook important research during the 1920s and advanced the use of chemicals in the food industry. He joined the Communist Party, 1927, and was made a member of the Soviet Central Executive Committee (VTslK), 1927. He was elected to the USSR Academy of Sciences, 1929, and president of the All-Union Chemistry Society, 1932. He founded the Biochemistry Institute, Academy of Sciences of the Soviet Union, 1935, and also edited a biochemistry journal. As such he can be regarded as the father of Soviet biochemistry. He was elected a people's deputy, USSR Supreme Soviet, 1937, and became director of the department of chemical sciences, USSR Academy of Sciences, 1939. He was awarded a scare prize, 1941. Bach was elected a member of the Party Central Committee, 1945. In 1928 he was elected a member of the Leopoldina.

His grave is located in the Novodevichy Cemetery (Plot 4, Row 24, No. 7) in Moscow.

References

External links
 

1857 births
1946 deaths
19th-century chemists
19th-century Ukrainian scientists
Soviet  chemists
20th-century Ukrainian scientists
People from Cherkasy Oblast
All-Russian Central Executive Committee members
First convocation members of the Soviet of the Union
Full Members of the USSR Academy of Sciences
Members of the Supreme Soviet of the Soviet Union
Socialist Revolutionary Party politicians
Taras Shevchenko National University of Kyiv alumni
Heroes of Socialist Labour
Stalin Prize winners
Recipients of the Order of Lenin
Recipients of the Order of the Red Banner of Labour
Russian revolutionaries
Soviet biochemists
Ukrainian biochemists
Ukrainian revolutionaries
Burials at Novodevichy Cemetery